The 1941 Clemson Tigers football team was an American football that represented Clemson College as a member of the Southern Conference during the 1941 college football season. In their second season under head coach Frank Howard, the Tigers compiled a 7–2 record (5–1 against conference opponents), finished third in the conference, and outscored opponents by a total of 233 to 90. The team played its home games at Riggs Field in Clemson, South Carolina.

Guard Wade Padgett was the team captain. The team's statistical leaders included tailback "Booty" Payne with 582 passing yards and fullback Charlie Timmons with 635 rushing yards and 77 points scored (9 touchdowns and 23 extra points).

Three Clemson players were selected by the Associated Press (AP) or United Press (UP) as first-team players on the 1941 All-Southern Conference football team: Charlie Timmons (AP-1, UP-1); end Joe Blalock (AP-1, UP-1); and tackle George Fritts (AP-1, UP-1).

Schedule

References

Clemson
Clemson Tigers football seasons
Clemson Tigers football